Hold Me Tight is a South Korean television series starring Han Hye-jin, Yoon Sang-hyun, Yoo In-young and Kim Tae-hoon. The series marks Han Hye-jin first lead role in four years. It aired on MBC's on Wednesdays and Thursdays at 21:55 KST time slot from March 21 to May 10, 2018.

Synopsis
The story of a married couple who have spent half their lives as partners. They look back on the time they have spent together and rediscover themselves as they suddenly have to confront death.

Cast

Main
 Han Hye-jin as Nam Hyun-joo, Do-young's wife who has sacrificed everything to support her husband, her longtime lover since college.
 Yoon Sang-hyun as Kim Do-young, Hyun-joo's husband who is a genius architect.
 Yoo In-young as Shin Da-hye, Do-young's first love.
 Kim Tae-hoon as Seok-jun, a prestigious doctor.

Supporting
 Lee Na-yoon as Kim Saet-byeol, Hyun-joo and Do-young's daughter.
 Lee Mi-do as Yoon Hong-sook
 Han Kyu-won as Bae Hee-joon
 Kim Soo-kyung as Yang Mi-young 
 Sung Ryung as Kim Eun-mi 
 Kong Jung-hwan as Park Young-geun 
 Heo Tae-hee as Choi Joon
 Jang Yong as Nam Jin-tae

Special appearance
 Jason Scott Nelson as Jason, a party-goer. (Ep. 23)

Production
The first script reading of the cast was held on January 28, 2018 at MBC Station in Sangam-dong.

Original soundtrack

Part 1

Part 2

Part 3

Part 4

Part 5

Part 6

Ratings

Awards and nominations

Notes

References

External links
  
 
 

MBC TV television dramas
2018 South Korean television series debuts
2018 South Korean television series endings
Korean-language television shows
South Korean romance television series
South Korean melodrama television series